

This page lists board and card games, wargames, miniatures games, and tabletop role-playing games published in 1982.  For video games, see 1982 in video gaming.

Games released or invented in 1982

Game awards given in 1982
 Spiel des Jahres: Enchanted Forest (German title is Sagaland)

Significant games-related events in 1982
Trivial Pursuit published, becoming the first trivia game.
TSR, Inc. purchases assets of Simulations Publications, Inc. following its bankruptcy.

See also
 1982 in video games

Games
Games by year